Stickney may refer to:

Places

 Stickney, Lincolnshire, England
 Stickney, Illinois, United States
 Stickney, Kansas, United States
 Stickney, South Dakota, United States
 Stickney, New Brunswick, Canada

Surname

 Alpheus Beede Stickney, American railroad executive
 Angeline Stickney, American suffragist, abolitionist, and mathematician
 Charles D. Stickney (c.1859–1924), New York assemblyman
 Dorothy Stickney, American actress
 Frederick Stickney, American architect.
 Pamelia Stickney, American musician
 Highland Stickney, American football coach
 Morgan Stickney (born 1997), American Paralympic swimmer
 Stuart Stickney, American golfer
 Thomas Stickney, early American military officer
 Timothy Stickney, American actor
 Trumbull Stickney, American classical scholar
 Wallace Stickney, American civil servant
 William Stickney (golfer), American golfer
 William W. Stickney (politician) (William Wallace Stickney), American lawyer and politician in Vermont
 William W. Stickney (USMC) (William Wallace Stickney), United States Marine Corps general and lawyer
 William Weir Stickney, American attorney and politician in New Hampshire
 William Stickney (board of directors member), member of the board of directors of the Columbia Institution for the Deaf

Other

 Stickney (crater)